The Men's decathlon competition at the 2002 Asian Games in Busan, South Korea was held on 9–10 October at the Busan Asiad Main Stadium.

Schedule
All times are Korea Standard Time (UTC+09:00)

Records

Results 
Legend
DNF — Did not finish
DNS — Did not start

100 metres 
 Wind – Heat 1: +0.2 m/s
 Wind – Heat 2: −0.6 m/s

Long jump

Shot put

High jump

400 metres

110 metres hurdles 
 Wind – Heat 1: 0.0 m/s
 Wind – Heat 2: 0.0 m/s

Discus throw

Pole vault

Javelin throw

1500 metres

Summary

References

External links 
Results

Athletics at the 2002 Asian Games
2002